Silent may mean any of the following:

People with the name
 Silent George, George Stone (outfielder) (1876–1945), American Major League Baseball outfielder and batting champion
 Brandon Silent (born 1973), South African former footballer
 Charles Silent (1842-1918), German-born American jurist

Arts, entertainment, and media

Music
 "Silent" (Gerald Walker), the first single from the rapper
 Silent (rock group), a Brazilian rock band
 Silent Theory, an American rock band
 The Silents, an Australian psychedelic rock band

Other uses in arts, entertainment, and media
 Dark (broadcasting) or silent, an off-air radio or TV station
 Silent film, a film with no sound

Other uses
 Air Energy AE-1 Silent, a German self-launching ultralight sailplane
 Buffalo Silents, a 1920s exhibition basketball team whose members were deaf and/or mute
 Silent Family, a German aircraft manufacturer
 Silent Generation, a demographic cohort between the Greatest Generation and the Baby Boomers
 Silent letter, a letter in a word which is not pronounced
 Silent Pool, a lake in Surrey, United Kingdom

See also
 List of people known as the Silent
 Silence (disambiguation)